Vinternatten is a Christmas album by Swedish singer Sanna Nielsen, released in Sweden on 19 November 2012. This is her second solo Christmas album, following her 1997 release, Min önskejul. The album features the lead single "Viskar ömt mitt namn", a ballad version of her Melodifestivalen 2011 song "I'm in Love" as well as a cover of Leona Lewis' worldwide hit "Bleeding Love".

Track listing
The album was released digitally and physically on November 19, 2012 with 12 tracks.

Promotion
On 16 December, Nielsen performed "Viskar ömt mitt namn" and "Drummer Boy" live on "Nyhetsmorgon".

Review
Scandipop gave the album a positive review saying; "It’s a fab album and well worth checking out before the year ends". They also said "Sanna’s new Christmas album ‘Vinternatten’ has been the biggest selling seasonal effort in Sweden this year".

Chart performance
"Vinternatten" debuted at #17 on the week commencing November 30, 2012 before peaking at #5 three weeks later. It spent 7 weeks on the chart.

Weekly charts

Year-end charts

References

External links

2012 Christmas albums
Sanna Nielsen albums
Swedish-language albums
Christmas albums by Swedish artists